The Tahora Formation is a Late Cretaceous geologic formation that outcrops in northeastern New Zealand near Napier. It is Haumurian in age according to the New Zealand geologic time scale (mainly Campanian, but ranging from Santonian to lower Maastrichtian). It forms part of the Upper Cretaceous to Teurian (Danian) (lower Paleocene) Tinui Group. It unconformably overlies the Jurassic to Lower Cretaceous Urewera Group or the Upper Cretaceous Matawai Group. It is conformably overlain by the Haumurian to Teurian Whangai Formation. It consist of three members, the Maungataniwha Sandstone Member, the Mutuera Member and the Houpapa Member. It is named for Tahora Station, south of Matawai in the Gisborne Region. The aptly named Maungataniwha (Māori for "mountain of monsters") Sandstone Member is known for its rich reptile fossil remains, first investigated by amateur palaeontologist Joan Wiffen.

Depositional environment 
The whole of the Tinui Group is interpreted to be an upper Cretaceous transgressive sequence. The Maungataniwha Sandstone Member was deposited in a very shallow water to beach environment. The siltstones of the time-equivalent Mutuera Member are thought to have been deposited in a mid to outer shelf environment. The Houpapa Member is interpreted to be the fill of local channels cut into the underlying strata.

Fossil content

Vertebrates 
Indeterminate dinosaur remains have been recovered from the formation, including indeterminate theropod, titanosaur, nodosaurid, and hypsilophodont remains. The humerus of a pterosaur very similar to the Australian Mythunga has also been found. An ulna of an indeterminate pterosaur known has also been found in this formation. Other fossils include Onchopristis dunklei, Mauisaurus haasti and Tuarangisaurus keyesi.

The theropod from the Tahora Formation would have been bipedal and likely carnivorous. Because of the lack of material, its exact taxonomic placement is uncertain, although its discoverer Joan Wiffen considered it possibly a megalosaurid, at the time a poorly defined group of unspecialized large carnivorous dinosaurs. The vertebra was described by Molnar (1981), and was considered an indeterminate theropod by Agnolin et al. (2010).

Invertebrates 
Invertebrates found in the formation include beetles, ammonites, annelids, belemnites, bivalves, brachiopods, crinoids, crustaceans, gastropods, nautiloids and scaphopods.

See also 
 List of dinosaur-bearing rock formations
 List of stratigraphic units with indeterminate dinosaur fossils
 Geology of the Raukumara Region
 Stratigraphy of New Zealand
 South Polar region of the Cretaceous

References 

Geologic formations of New Zealand
Cretaceous System of Oceania
Campanian Stage
Sandstone formations
Conglomerate formations
Fossiliferous stratigraphic units of Oceania
Paleontology in New Zealand
Gisborne District